Dandelion is the first album by French psychedelic folk band Dandelion.

Released as a private pressing of only 300 copies by Le Kiosque D'Orphée in 1979, the album was sold locally in their gigs. It was recorded on the Cultural Center of Giromagny in five days (26/08/79 - 01/09/79) with just a couple of two track tape recorders and a minimal budget. The album was all sung in English except for track number 3 "La Farfalla" sung in Italian by Sophie Pfister. The album cover was made by Sophie's sister Anne.

The re-issue label Guerseen, released the album on CD in 2007.

Track listing
All tracks composed and written by Jean Christophe Graf, except where noted.
"Sometimes" - 3:53
"Two Faced Girl" - 2:00
"La Farfalla" (Graf/Sophie Pfister) - 2:07
"Something Odd" (Graf/P. Guyénot) - 3:37 
"Winter Sale" - 5:56
"I Wanna See You" - 2:55
"Let It Know" - 3:55
"Sweet Ole Dynamite" - 2:18
"Patti" - 3:26
"Why" - 6:10

References

1979 debut albums
Dandelion (French band) albums